A winding hole is a widened area of a canal (usually in the United Kingdom), used for turning a canal boat such as a narrowboat. In sea ports an area for turning ships is usually called a turning basin.

Etymology

The word is commonly believed to derive from the practice of using the wind to assist with the turn.

Another etymology, however, is the Old English word for turn - "windan", (pronounced with a short I (as in windlass, a handle for winding (long I) gears)).  Much UK canal terminology comes from spoken rather than written tradition and from bargees who did not read or write.

It is also possible that the word has a similar derivation to that of the windlass, which derives from the Old Norse "vinda" and "ás"—words currently used in Iceland—where the modern word for "windlass" is "vinda".

History
Because the average width of a canal channel (about 30' to 40' feet) is less than the length of a full-size narrow boat (72') it is not usually possible to turn a boat in the canal. Winding holes are typically indentations in the off-side (non-towpath side) of the canal, allowing sufficient space to turn the boat.

Use
A winding hole consists of a "notch" in the canal bank. A turning boat inserts its bow into the notch and swings the stern round. In the days of horse-drawn boats, this was accomplished using bargepoles.

See also

Turning basin
Canals of the United Kingdom
History of the British canal system

References

Water transport infrastructure
Canals